O’More College of Design was a private college in Franklin, Tennessee. In February 2018, it merged with Belmont University in Nashville, Tennessee to become the O'More School of Design at Belmont University. Information regarding the programs that were a part of the O'More College of Design can be found here:  

It was founded as O'More School of Interior Architecture and Design in 1970 in the historic district of Franklin. It awarded the Bachelor of Fine Arts degree in Fashion Design, Fashion Merchandising, Graphic Design, and Interior Design.  It had an enrollment of about 200 students and was accredited by the Accrediting Commission of Career Schools and Colleges.

References

Private universities and colleges in Tennessee
Educational institutions established in 1970
Education in Williamson County, Tennessee
Buildings and structures in Franklin, Tennessee
Design schools in the United States
Fashion merchandising
Belmont University